This article lists political parties in the Dominican Republic.

The Dominican Republic has a multi-party system, with two or three strong parties and a third party that is electorally successful.

Parties

Major parties 
The PRM and PLD are considered major parties in the Dominican Republic.

Congressional parties 
The parties listed below have at least one seat in either the Senate or the Chamber of Deputies after the 2020 general election.

Local parties 
The parties listed below are not represented in Congress, but control at least one municipal council.

Other parties

Extra-parliamentary parties

Defunct political parties

See also

 List of political parties by country

References

Dominican Republic
 
Political parties
Political parties
Dominican Republic